Auston Taylour Matthews (born September 17, 1997) is an American professional ice hockey center and alternate captain for the Toronto Maple Leafs of the National Hockey League (NHL). Born in San Ramon, California, Matthews and his family moved to Scottsdale, Arizona, when he was an infant. After playing baseball and hockey during his childhood, he developed a particular interest in hockey after watching the local Phoenix Coyotes play. A product of the USA Hockey National Team Development Program in the United States Hockey League (USHL), Matthews played for the ZSC Lions of the Swiss National League prior to being drafted into the NHL in 2016, winning a Swiss Cup title that same year. Matthews was widely considered the top prospect of the draft, and was selected first overall by the Toronto Maple Leafs.

Matthews became the first player in modern NHL history to score four goals in his NHL debut. He scored 40 goals in his first season in 2016–17, setting the Maple Leafs rookie record and becoming just the second rookie since the 2004–05 lockout to reach the milestone (along with Alexander Ovechkin); he is just the fourth teenager in league history to accomplish the feat. His performance won him the Calder Memorial Trophy as the NHL's top rookie for the season. In 2020–21, Matthews won the Maurice "Rocket" Richard Trophy as the league's leading goal scorer with 41 goals in 52 games. In 2021–22, Matthews set records for most goals scored in a single season by both an American-born player and a Maple Leaf, reached the 60-goal mark for the first time, and won the Rocket Richard Trophy for the second consecutive season. He was also awarded the  Ted Lindsay Award most outstanding player, as voted by his peers, and the Hart Trophy for Most Valuable Player.

Internationally, Matthews has represented the United States on several occasions, including a U17 World Hockey Challenge, two U18 World Championships, two U20 World Championships, and one IIHF World Championship appearance.

Early life
Auston Taylour Matthews was born in San Ramon, California to Brian, from California, and Ema, originally from Hermosillo, Mexico. He and his family moved to Scottsdale, Arizona when he was two months old, and he began attending Phoenix Coyotes games at age two. His favorite players to watch were Shane Doan and Daniel Brière. Initially, Matthews did not have much interest in the sport but was captivated by the Zamboni machine that cleaned the ice during intermissions. He first expressed a desire to play hockey shortly after his fifth birthday, and began playing with the Arizona Bobcats minor hockey program. On January 16, 2006, Matthews (who was eight years old at the time) attended a game between the Coyotes and Washington Capitals where he witnessed Alexander Ovechkin's famous goal that would come to be known simply as "The Goal", where Ovechkin scored a goal while lying on his back after having been tripped by the Coyotes' defense. In a 2016 interview, Matthews referred to the goal as "probably one of the best goals ever". 

As a child, Matthews played both hockey and baseball. According to his father, baseball was his best sport; Auston's hand-eye coordination made him an excellent hitter. However, Matthews opted to pursue a career in hockey because he disliked the slow pace of baseball. When he first started playing hockey, his parents knew almost nothing of the sport. His main coach during his youth was Boris Dorozhenko, who had previously founded the national ice hockey program of Mexico. During Dorozhenko's first few years in the U.S., he lived with Matthews and his parents. Matthews played in the 2010 Quebec International Pee-Wee Hockey Tournament with the Kharkov minor ice hockey team.

Playing career

Junior
Matthews was drafted 57th overall by the Western Hockey League's (WHL) Everett Silvertips in the 2012 WHL Bantam Draft but opted to play for the USA Hockey National Team Development Program, which participates in the United States Hockey League (USHL). That season, he played for the U.S. National U17 Team (USDP), where he gained national attention from NHL scouts, even being featured on the NHL website, with emphasis put on his unique southwestern background. In his second season with the U.S. National U18 Team (USDP), Matthews finished first in league scoring with 116 points (55 goals and 61 assists), breaking the National Team Development Program record of 102 points set by the Chicago Blackhawks' Patrick Kane in 2005–06 and besting Vegas Golden Knights' Jack Eichel by 29 points. On May 21, 2015, Matthews won the USA Hockey Bob Johnson Award for excellence in international competition.

Matthews trained with the USA Hockey National Team Development Program team during the 2013–14 and 2014–15 seasons. He was named the most valuable player at the 2015 World U18 Championships in addition to being named to the IIHF All-Star Team, and named the IIHF Best Forward after finishing as the tournament's top scorer.

ZSC Lions

Rather than continue in American amateur hockey or play major junior hockey in the Canadian Hockey League, Matthews chose to play professionally for his last season before he was eligible for the 2016 NHL Entry Draft, having missed the 2015 NHL Entry Draft cutoff date of birth by two days. On August 7, 2015, he signed a one-year contract to play in the Swiss National League A (NLA) for ZSC Lions. Matthews was approached by Lions head coach Marc Crawford, who was awed by his skating and puck possession while scouting the 2015 World U18 Championships. Crawford quickly called Matthews' agent, Pat Brisson, to discuss the proposal of signing the player to the team. Matthews and his family quickly agreed once the tournament had ended and spent the next few months applying for various paperwork. After missing the first four games of the 2015–16 regular season, he made his NLA debut on September 18, 2015, and scored his first goal in the game against goaltender Benjamin Conz of HC Fribourg-Gottéron on home ice at the Hallenstadion. He would spend most of the season on a line with Robert Nilsson, finding chemistry with the veteran forward.

On February 3, 2016, Matthews recorded two assists in a 4–1 win over the Lausanne HC in the 2015–16 Swiss Cup final. He finished the 2015–16 regular season as the second top-scorer on the Lions and tenth in the NLA. His 1.28 points-per-game average was second in the league behind only longtime NHL player Pierre-Marc Bouchard. He also won the NLA Rising Star Award and was second to Bouchard in voting for most valuable player. Matthews' stint in the NLA ended earlier than expected when the top-seeded Lions were swept in the first round of the 2016 playoffs by SC Bern.

Toronto Maple Leafs
In late June, Matthews was selected first overall in the 2016 NHL Entry Draft by the Toronto Maple Leafs, becoming the first American to be picked with the top selection since Patrick Kane in 2007. Matthews had been widely expected to go first overall for several months leading up to the event, consistently topping prospect charts and major scouting report. Media speculation suggested that Matthews and the team had engaged in a minor contract dispute over the issue of performance bonuses; Matthews was asking the team for a contract similar to that of Connor McDavid or Jack Eichel, which were both valued at $3.775 million annually, inclusive of bonuses. Although Maple Leafs general manager Lou Lamoriello had been very open over his disapproval of including bonuses in player contracts in the past, he was clear in stating that performance bonuses were never an issue while negotiating Matthews' contract. Lamoriello had previously been involved in a contract dispute while with the New Jersey Devils with fourth overall pick Adam Larsson over the issue of bonuses; there were no bonus clauses included in Larsson's entry-level contract. 

On July 21, the two parties finalized a deal, with Matthews signing a three-year, entry-level contract which included the maximum allocation of performance bonuses. Lamoriello said that the contract was negotiated within ten minutes of sitting down with Matthews' agent, Pat Brisson, and that the deal was done "the Toronto way". Brisson would later confirm that the two parties did not have any issues negotiating the contract. The contract was identical in value to those McDavid and Eichel had signed one year earlier. Two weeks later, Matthews was given the NLA Youngster of the Year award, reserved for the league's top rookie. It was his fifth award from his stint in Switzerland.

2016–17
Matthews made his NHL debut in the Maple Leafs' first game of the season on October 12, 2016, against the Ottawa Senators. He scored four goals in the game, all against Craig Anderson. This was the first time in modern NHL history a player scored four goals in his debut; previously, Joe Malone and Harry Hyland scored five goals each in their NHL debuts on December 19, 1917 (the first game in the history of the NHL). Four others had scored three goals since then. 

Matthews' jersey went on sale following his debut, and it quickly became the highest-selling jersey in the NHL. Two months later, in the NHL Centennial Classic against the Detroit Red Wings, Matthews scored the game-winning goal in overtime, securing a 5–4 victory for the Maple Leafs. He was named NHL's Rookie of the Month for December after leading all rookies with 8 goals and 12 points in 12 games. 

On January 10, 2017, Matthews was the only Leafs player selected to participate in the 2017 NHL All-Star Game. On March 28, 2017, Matthews scored his 35th goal of the season, surpassing Wendel Clark's previous record for most goals in a season (34) by a Leafs' rookie. April 3 saw Matthews score his 39th goal and 67th point, breaking the franchise record for most points in a season, as well as the record for most goals by an American-born rookie. A few days later, he scored his 40th goal of the season, becoming the second rookie since the 2004–05 lockout to reach the milestone and the fourth teenager in NHL history to do so. He finished the year with 40 goals, second-most in the NHL. 

Matthews' play assisted the Maple Leafs in making the Stanley Cup playoffs for the first time in a full season since 2004, where the team played the top-seeded Washington Capitals in the first round. After going pointless in the first two games of the series, Matthews scored in each of the last four games as the team was eliminated in six games by the Capitals. His four consecutive games with a goal marked the first time since 1986 where a teenager scored in four straight playoff games, when Wendel Clark did it, also with Toronto. Matthews was also the only NHL rookie since the Winnipeg Jets' Teemu Selänne in 1992–93 to record at least one shot on goal in all 82 regular season games. In recognition for his accomplishments throughout the year, Matthews was awarded the Calder Memorial Trophy as the NHL's top rookie, with 164 of 167 first-place votes. He was the first Maple Leafs' rookie to receive the trophy in 50 years since Brit Selby in 1966.

2017–18

Matthews set the unofficial NHL record for most consecutive games with a shot on goal to start a career. His 103-game streak ended in a 4–1 victory over the Calgary Flames on November 28, 2017. On December 9, after colliding with teammate Morgan Rielly during a game against the Pittsburgh Penguins, Matthews missed six games to recover from a concussion. On January 10, 2018, Matthews was selected as the sole Maple Leaf to participate in the 2018 NHL All-Star Game. On February 24, it was revealed that Matthews had suffered a shoulder injury and would be out for at least ten days. However, he did not return to the Toronto lineup until March 22, 2018, where he scored a goal in the second period to help the Leafs win 5–2 over the Nashville Predators. Despite missing 20 games, Matthews finished the regular season with 34 goals and averaged over one point per game. The Maple Leafs qualified for the Stanley Cup playoffs for the second consecutive season but were eliminated in the first round by the Boston Bruins. He was not particularly productive in his second playoff run, finishing with one goal and one assist in seven games.

2018–19
The Maple Leafs opened their 2018–19 season on October 3, 2018, against the Montreal Canadiens. In that game, Matthews scored the team's first goal along with the overtime-winning goal in a 3–2 win. After recording five goals and three assists through the first three games of the season, Matthews was named the NHL's First Star of the Week on October 9. His points streak continued, recording four goals over the next two games for a total of 12 points in 5 games. In doing so, he became the youngest player in NHL history to record five multi-point games to open the season, breaking a record set by Wayne Gretzky in 1983. He continued his goal streak the next game against the defending Stanley Cup champions, the Washington Capitals. In scoring his tenth goal of the season, Matthews became only the fifth player since the 1943–44 season to record ten goals in his team's first six games of the season. On October 27, after being hit by Winnipeg Jets defenseman Jacob Trouba in a 3–2 Maple Leafs win, Matthews sustained a left shoulder injury and was set to be sidelined for at least four weeks. After missing 14 games, Matthews returned to the lineup on November 28 against the San Jose Sharks; he recorded two goals and one assist in Toronto's 5–3 win. On December 27, Matthews was voted as captain of the Atlantic Division in the 2019 National Hockey League All-Star Game. While it was his first year as a captain, it was Matthews' third All-Star selection.

On February 5, 2019, Matthews signed a new five-year, $58.17 million contract with Toronto worth an average annual value of $11.634 million, effective from the 2019–20 season. He later scored his 100th and 101st NHL goal on February 14, becoming the third-fastest Maple Leaf who began their career in Toronto to reach the milestone and the first since 1933. Matthews reached the 30-goal mark for the third consecutive season on February 25, 2019, after scoring in a 5–3 win over the Buffalo Sabres. In doing so, he became the first Maple Leaf to score at least 30 goals in each of his first three seasons.

Matthews finished the 2018–19 regular season with a career-high 73 points in 68 games to finish third in team scoring behind Mitch Marner (94) and John Tavares (88), both of whom also finished with career-highs in points. In the 2019 playoffs, Matthews set a playoff career-high with five goals and six points in seven games. However, the Maple Leafs were eliminated by the Boston Bruins in seven games for the second-straight season.

2019–20

At the start of the 2019–20 season, Matthews was named an alternate captain for the Maple Leafs. He scored two goals in the season opener against the Ottawa Senators on October 3, becoming the fourth player in NHL history to score in each of their first four-season openers. As of that game, Matthews ranked third in the NHL with 116 goals in 215 games since making his debut in 2016. On October 7, Matthews was named the third NHL Star of the Week. He was then named to his fourth straight All-Star appearance, but due to an "ongoing wrist condition", he would not participate in the festivities; he was replaced by Senators winger Brady Tkachuk. Matthews would finish the abbreviated regular season with career-highs in goals (47) and points (80). His 47 goals placed him second in the league, one goal behind Alexander Ovechkin and David Pastrňák for the league lead. 

The season ended in disappointment for Matthews and the Leafs, losing in the best-of-five qualifying round against the Columbus Blue Jackets. Matthews scored twice in the five-game series, including the overtime winner to cap off an improbable three-goal rally in the last five minutes of Game 4.

2020–21
Due to the COVID-19 pandemic and resultant limitations on cross-border travel, the 2020–21 NHL season occurred under a vastly different arrangement than previously, with the Leafs grouped in an all-Canadian North Division and playing exclusively within that division for the regular season. The shortened 2020–21 season was Matthews' most successful to date, recording 41 goals in 56 games (a 60-goal pace over a full season), and 66 total points. He became the first Maple Leaf to win the Maurice "Rocket" Richard Trophy, awarded to the player who scored the most goals in the regular season. He was also the first American winner, and the second to lead the NHL in goals. He was subsequently named as a finalist for the Hart Memorial Trophy, awarded by the Professional Hockey Writers' Association to the league's most valuable player; he was the first Leaf finalist since Doug Gilmour in 1993. Matthews ultimately finished second in Hart voting behind Connor McDavid.

The Maple Leafs finished first in the North Division, and faced the Montreal Canadiens in the first round of the 2021 Stanley Cup playoffs, where they were considered the heavy favourites to win, which would have been the team's first playoff series win since 2004. The Leafs lost the first game of the series, but won the next three to take a seeming stranglehold. However, they went on to lose the next three games, and thus the series 4–3. In a personal disappointment for Matthews, he only recorded one goal and four assists in the Maple Leafs' fifth-straight early exit.

2021–22
In August, Matthews underwent wrist surgery after experiencing discomfort in training, and it was announced he would miss six weeks. He returned to practice the last week of September.

Due to injury recovery, Matthews missed the first three games of the 2021–22 season. Upon his return, he was slow to start, notching only one goal in his first six games, the worst season-opening pace of his career. However, after this he began scoring at a prodigious pace, eventually overtaking Leon Draisaitl to lead the NHL in goal-scoring by the midpoint of the season. New linemate Michael Bunting remarked "he's the best player in the league. That's just my opinion. Some people might say it’s biased. But in my opinion, he’s the best player by far." Matthews' achievements began to raise discussions of him as a possible frontrunner for the Hart Memorial Trophy. On March 14, 2022, Matthews was suspended for two games after crosschecking Buffalo Sabres defenseman Rasmus Dahlin at the 2022 Heritage Classic the day before. 

On March 31, 2022, Matthews scored an empty net goal in a 7–3 Maple Leafs victory over the Winnipeg Jets, reaching 50 goals in a season for the first time in his career. He was only the fourth Maple Leafs player to achieve this, and the first to do so since Dave Andreychuk in the 1993–94 season. He also set a franchise record for the fewest games necessary to score 50, having done so in 62 games. Days later, Matthews scored his seventh career hat-trick in an April 4 game against the Tampa Bay Lightning and tied the franchise record for goals in a season (54), set by Rick Vaive in 1981–82. This also marked the highest goal total for an NHL player in a single season since Lightning captain Steven Stamkos' 60-goal 2011–12 campaign. His offensive spree continued, and in a game against the Dallas Stars on April 7, he first surpassed Vaive's record with his 55th goal of the season in the second period, and then set a new NHL record for most goals in a single season by a United States-born player when he scored his 56th and game-winning goal in overtime, beating the previous record jointly held by Jimmy Carson and Kevin Stevens. In his next game on April 9 against the Montreal Canadiens he scored his 57th and 58th goals of the season, passing Frank Mahovlich for the most even-strength goals in a season by a Maple Leaf, and becoming the first player to score 51 goals in a span of 50 games (at any point during a season) since Mario Lemieux achieved the feat in the 1995–96 season. He reached 100 points in a single season for the first time in his career on April 14. In a game against the Detroit Red Wings on April 26, Matthews scored his 59th and 60th goals of the season, becoming the first player in Maple Leafs history to score 60 goals in a season, and only the third in the post-lockout NHL to score 60 or more, alongside Stamkos and Alexander Ovechkin, who set the modern record with 65. This secured his second straight Rocket Richard trophy, joining Ovechkin and Pavel Bure as the only players to win it consecutively. Matthews was later named a finalist for the Hart Memorial Trophy and Ted Lindsay Award, both for the second consecutive year; Connor McDavid was a finalist alongside Matthews for both awards, as were Igor Shesterkin and Roman Josi for the Hart and Ted Lindsay, respectively. He finished the regular season having played 73 games and scored 60 goals, 46 assists and 106 points, all of which were career highs.

Advancing into the Stanley Cup playoffs, Matthews and the Maple Leafs drew the Tampa Bay Lightning, two-time defending champions, in the first round. Matthews scored twice in the Leafs' 5–0 win in game one, and also scored the game-winning goal as the Leafs came from behind to win game five, 4–3. He led all skaters in the series with 4 goals, 9 points, and 32 hits in the seven-game series. Despite Matthews' career-best playoff output, the Leafs failed to make it past the first round yet again, marking the franchise's eighth consecutive playoff series loss.

On June 21, 2022, Matthews was named the winner of both the Hart Trophy and Ted Lindsay Award, receiving 119 Hart first-place votes to runner-up McDavid's 29. He was the first Leafs player to win the Lindsay, and the third to win the Hart - the first to do so in 67 years. He also finished in the top 10 in voting for the Lady Byng Trophy for sportsmanlike conduct, and the Selke Trophy for his defensive play.

2022–23
Despite scoring at a somewhat slower pace in the first half of the season, on January 3, 2023, Matthews became the fastest Leafs player to register 500 career points in a game against the St. Louis Blues. He missed three weeks of play in January and February as the result of a knee injury, and would subsequently admit that he had been dealing with complications from a hand injury for most of the season.

International play

Matthews helped lead the United States men's national under-18 ice hockey team to gold at the 2014 IIHF World U18 Championship. He did so again in the 2015 Championship, leading the tournament in scoring and being named the Most Valuable Player (MVP), as well as earning the top forward slot on the Media All-Star Team. He was also named to the roster for the 2015 Deutschland Cup but was forced to pull out of the tournament due to a back injury.

At the 2016 IIHF World Junior Championships held in Helsinki, Matthews and Matthew Tkachuk each recorded 11 points to lead the United States men's national junior ice hockey team in scoring. After losing in the semifinals, the United States defeated Sweden to win the bronze medal. His seven goals in the tournament were one short of Jeremy Roenick's American record of eight, which was set in 1989. In recognition of his play, Matthews was named to the tournament All-Star Team. Later that year, Matthews played with the United States national men's senior team at the 2016 IIHF World Championship, during which he led the Americans in point scoring.

Later in 2016, Matthews was announced as a member of Team North America for the 2016 World Cup of Hockey. He began the pre-tournament games playing left wing on the third line, playing alongside Ryan Nugent-Hopkins and Nathan MacKinnon. After impressing, he began the tournament on the top line with Jack Eichel and Connor McDavid. The three found chemistry but were unable to help North America to a medal finish. Matthews finished the tournament with three points in three games played. Following the Toronto Maple Leafs' first-round elimination in the 2017 playoffs, he was advised by the team to forego participating in the 2017 IIHF World Championship and to instead rest.

Personal life
Matthews comes from a family of athletes, with his father having played college baseball and with an uncle, Wes Matthews, who briefly played in the National Football League for the Miami Dolphins. His father is the chief technology officer of a manufacturing company based in New Jersey. He has two sisters: Alexandria, who is three years older, and Breyana, who is five years younger. Due to his mother's Mexican ancestry, Matthews can speak some Spanish.

Off the ice, Matthews was enrolled in several online courses with the University of Nebraska Omaha. In late August 2016, he moved to Toronto and began working out with teammates Mitch Marner and Morgan Rielly. Matthews' favorite athlete growing up was Kobe Bryant, while his favorite sports movie is The Mighty Ducks. He is a fan of players Jonathan Toews and Anže Kopitar due to their all around offensive and defensive game, has had his playing style compared to them. In recognition of Matthews' four-goal NHL debut, rap artist SVDVM released a song titled "Auston Matthews". At the 2019 NHL Awards, Matthews was named the cover athlete for EA Sports' ice hockey video game NHL 20.

In September 2019, Matthews was charged with disorderly conduct concerning an incident in his hometown of Scottsdale, Arizona, in May 2019, after he exposed his underwear to a female security guard. Matthews stated it was "an error in judgment" not to advise the Maple Leafs team management of the incident, and there was speculation that the incident contributed to the Leafs' decision to not give Matthews the captaincy of the Maple Leafs. The charges were dismissed on November 13, 2019, after a settlement was reached between Matthews and the complainant.

On June 19, 2020, the Toronto Sun reported that Matthews had tested positive for COVID-19 while at home in Scottsdale, Arizona before the start of training camp. Due to privacy concerns, the Toronto Maple Leafs did not comment on Matthews' condition regarding COVID-19, however, on July 13, 2020, the first day of training camp, Matthews confirmed with reporters that he did contract the virus and that he was "mostly asymptomatic".

Career statistics

Regular season and playoffs
Bold indicates led league

International

Awards and honors

Records

NHL
Most goals scored in an NHL debut in the modern era (four goals), surpassing Alex Smart, Réal Cloutier, Fabian Brunnström and Derek Stepan (three goals).
Most goals by an American-born rookie (40), surpassing Neal Broten who scored 38 goals in his rookie season with the Minnesota North Stars in the 1981–82 season.
Most consecutive games with a shot on goal to start a career. His 103-game streak ended in a 4–1 victory over the Calgary Flames on November 28, 2017.
Youngest player (age 21) to record multiple points in each of his team's first five games of a season, surpassing Wayne Gretzky (age 22).

Toronto Maple Leafs
Most goals in a single season (60 in the 2021–22 season), surpassed Rick Vaive, who had 54 in the 1981–82 season.
Fastest Maple Leafs player to score 25 goals (52 games), surpassed Howie Meeker (58 games in 1946–47).
Most points by a rookie (69), surpassed Peter Ihnačák, who had 66 in the 1982–83 season.
Most goals by a rookie (40), surpassed Wendel Clark, who had 34 in the 1985–86 season.
First (and only) Maple Leafs player to score at least 30 goals in the first four seasons of his career.
Fewest games necessary to score 50 goals in one season (62).
Fastest Maple Leafs player to score 500 points (445 games), surpassed Daryl Sittler, who scored 500 points in 517 games.

Filmography

References

External links

 

1997 births
Living people
American expatriate ice hockey players in Canada
American men's ice hockey centers
American sportspeople of Mexican descent
Calder Trophy winners
Hart Memorial Trophy winners
Ice hockey players from California
Ice hockey people from Scottsdale, Arizona
Lester B. Pearson Award winners
National Hockey League All-Stars
National Hockey League first-overall draft picks
People from San Ramon, California
Rocket Richard Trophy winners
Sportspeople from the San Francisco Bay Area
Toronto Maple Leafs draft picks
Toronto Maple Leafs players
USA Hockey National Team Development Program players
ZSC Lions players